No Trespassing may refer to:
A notice against trespassing

Film
No Trespassing (1922 film), starring Irene Castle
No Trespassing, alternate title for The Red House
No Trespassing (1975 film), a Romanian film

Music
No Trespassing (album), a 2012 album by Too Short
No Trespassing (EP), a 1986 EP by The Roches
"No Trespassing" (song), a 1989 song by George Fox

See also
Trespass (disambiguation)